Archie B. Brusse (1888–1959) was an American orthodontist who is known to be one of the founders of the Rocky Mountain Society of Orthodontists in 1921. He was also one of the founders of the Denver Summer Meeting for the Advanced Study of Orthodontics. Brusse also founded the Rocky Mountain Orthodontics Company.

Life
He was one of the six sons of John and Jessie Elliott Brusse. Archie went to high school in Denver, Colorado, and attended Denver University Dental School in 1912. After obtaining his dental degree, he practiced dentistry for many years. He then started working under Dr. Albert H. Ketcham, who also practiced in Denver. Archie married Dana Martin in 1918. In 1921, he helped establish the Rocky Mountain Society of Orthodontists in 1921. In 1941, he became the president of the organization also. He was also one of the founders of the Denver Summer Meeting for the Advanced Study of Orthodontics.

Awards and positions
  American Association of Orthodontists – President (1946)
 Denver Summer Meeting for the Advanced Study of Orthodontics – Founder
 Rocky Mountain Society of Orthodontists – Founder

References

American dentists
Orthodontists
1888 births
1959 deaths
University of Colorado Denver alumni
20th-century dentists